Kongereh or Kangareh or Kangrah or Kongerah or Kang-i-Rah() may refer to:
 Kongereh, Kamyaran
 Kangareh, Qorveh